Kottayam-Malabar is a census town near Kuthuparamba in Kannur district of Kerala state in India.  It is different from the city of Kottayam in Kottayam district of the same state.

History
Kingdom of Kottayam is a historic province of old Malabar district in India.  It covered what is today Talassery Taluk of Kannur district.  The headquarters of the kingdom was at Kottayam-Malabar town.  The Raja of Kottayam presided over the province. Pazhassi Raja was a member of the western branch of the Kottayam royal clan. When Hyder Ali of the Kingdom of Mysore occupied Malabar in 1773, the Raja of Kottayam found political asylum in Kallara near Vikom in Kottayam district of Kerala. Pazhassi Raja, the fourth prince in line for succession to the throne during this period, became one of the de facto heads of state, surpassing several older royal contenders.

Demographics
As of 2011 Census, Kottayam-Malabar census town had population of 19,176 which constitutes 8,813 males and 10,363 females. The sex ratio was 1176 higher than state average of 1084. Population of children in the age group 0-6 was 2,302 (12%) where 1,141 are males and 1,161 are females. Kottayam-Malabar had an overall literacy of 96.2% higher than state average of 94%. The male literacy stands at 97.7% and female literacy was 95%.

Transportation
The national highway passes through Thalassery town. Mangalore, Goa and Mumbai can be accessed on the northern side and Kochi and Thiruvananthapuram can be accessed on the southern side.  The road to the east of Iritty connects to Mysore and Bangalore.   The nearest railway station is Thalassery on Mangalore-Palakkad line. 
Trains are available to almost all parts of India subject to advance booking over the internet.  There are airports at Mangalore and Kozhikode. Both of them are international airports but direct flights are available only to Middle Eastern countries.

See also
 Kingdom of Kottayam

References

External links 
 The Royal 'Rebel'
 Pazhassi Raja: The Royal Rebel by Shreekumar Varma (Macmillan, 1997)
 Peasant Protests in Kerala 
 Eye witness account from Lachlan Macquarie who participated in one of the battle against Pazhassi Raja 

Feudal states of Kerala
Cities and towns in Kannur district
 Villages near Kuthuparamba